Ruellia trivialis is a plant native of Cerrado vegetation of Brazil.

trivialis
Flora of Brazil